The 2018 season is Stallion Laguna's 2nd season in the top flight of Philippine football.

Pre-season and friendlies

Friendlies

Competitions

Overview

Philippines Football League

Results summary

Note:
 a Three points was deducted for Stallion Laguna from the league standing due to the club's failure to comply with Liga Futbol Inc. Disciplinary Committee’s Decision No. 010318DC03.

Results by round

Matches

Notes:
 a  Due to the bad condition of the pitch in the Cebu City Sports Complex, both teams agreed to play the matches in Stallion's home venue Biñan Football Stadium or in neutral venue PFF National Training Centre.
 b  Due to the unavailability of Iloilo Sports Complex, the match will be played in their previous "home" venue University of Makati Stadium.
 c  Due to the unavailability of Marikina Sports Complex, both teams agreed to play all the matches in Stallion's home venue Biñan Football Stadium.
 d  Due to the unavailability of Davao del Norte Sports Complex, both matches will be played in the neutral venue Rizal Memorial Stadium.
 d  Originally schedule on 8 July but the match was abandoned by Global Cebu. Stallion Laguna won 3–0 by default.

Copa Paulino Alcantara

Group stage

Notes:

 a  Due to the unavailability of Biñan Football Stadium, the match will be played in neutral venue Rizal Memorial Stadium.
 b  Due to the unavailability of Panaad Stadium, the match will be played in neutral venue Rizal Memorial Stadium.
 c  Due to the unavailability of Davao del Norte Sports Complex, the match will be played in neutral venue Rizal Memorial Stadium.

Knockout stage

League squad

Transfers

Pre-season transfer

In

Mid-season transfer

In

Out

References

Stallion Laguna 2018
Stallion Laguna 2018